Luoxiongichthys is an extinct genus of basal actinopterygian (ray-finned fish) known from the lower Middle Triassic (Pelsonian substage, Anisian stage) of Luoxiong Town, Luoping County of Yunnan Province, southwestern China. It is known from the holotype LPV-10144, which consists of nearly complete skeleton and skull, from the paratype LPV-10120, a partial skull and from the referred materials LPV-10625, LPV-6868 and LPV-11817. It was found in the new Middle Triassic Lagerstätte of the Guanling Formation, Member II. It was first named by Wen Wen, Qi-Yue Zhang, Chang-Yong Zhou, Jin-Yuan Huang, Zhong Qiang Chen and Michael J. Benton in 2011 and the type species is Luoxiongichthys hyperdorsalis. The generic name is derived from Luoxiong Town, where the specimens were found and ichthys, "fish" from Greek. The specific name comes from hyper, "over" and dorsalis, "of the back" from Greek in reference to its elevated "hump" in front of the dorsal fin.

Phylogeny
Cladogram after Wen et al., 2011:

References

Prehistoric ray-finned fish genera
Triassic bony fish
Fossil taxa described in 2011
Triassic fish of Asia
Anisian life
Guanling Formation